A 49er class two-handed sailing dinghy competition formed part of the 2000 Summer Olympics in Sydney, Australia. Seventeen crews took part. The gold medal was won by Jyrki Järvi and Thomas Johanson of Finland.

Results

References

External links
 International Sailing Federation

Sailing at the 2000 Summer Olympics
49er (dinghy)
Unisex sailing at the Summer Olympics